Alphonse-Arthur Miville Déchêne (April 17, 1848 – May 1, 1902) was a Canadian lumber merchant and political figure in Quebec. He represented L'Islet in the House of Commons of Canada as a Liberal member from 1896 to 1901 and sat for De la Durantaye division in the Senate of Canada from 1901 to 1902.

He was born in L'Islet, Canada East, the son of Alfred Miville, dit Dechêne, and was educated at the Collège Sainte-Anne. In 1891, he married Aurore Ouillet. He served as mayor of Saint-Pamphile. Déchêne died in office at the age of 54.

His son Joseph Bruno Aimé Miville Déchêne also served in the House of Commons. His brother François-Gilbert Miville Dechêne represented L'Islet in the Legislative Assembly of Quebec.

References 
 

1848 births
1902 deaths
Members of the House of Commons of Canada from Quebec
Liberal Party of Canada MPs
Canadian senators from Quebec
Liberal Party of Canada senators
Mayors of places in Quebec
French Quebecers